The Bohemian War (1468–1478) began when the Kingdom of Bohemia was invaded by the king of Hungary, Matthias Corvinus. Matthias invaded with the pretext of returning Bohemia to Catholicism; at the time, it was ruled by the Hussite king, George of Poděbrady. Matthias' invasion was largely successful, leading to his acquisition of the southern and eastern parts of the country. Its core lands however, centered on Prague, were never taken. Ultimately both Matthias and George would proclaim themselves king, though neither ever acquired all the necessary subordinate titles. When George died in 1471, his successor Vladislaus II continued the fight against Matthias. In 1478, the war ended following the treaties of Brno and the Olomouc. Upon Matthias' death in 1490, Vladislaus would succeed him as king of both Hungary and Bohemia.

Background
At the beginning of his reign, Matthias continued the policy of his father John Hunyadi in defending Hungary, the "bulwark of Christendom," against the Turks. However, as Matthias led campaigns each year, he came to the realization that by the late 15th century it was no longer possible to oust the Ottoman Turks from Europe. Rankling under the heavy costs of bordering the Sultan, and resenting his Christian neighbors, like Frederick III, who often meddled in Hungary when Matthias was on campaign, Matthias made the radical decision to come to an entente with the Turks, enabling the Hungarian king to turn westward.

The war
In 1468, Matthias began a war in Bohemia on the pretext of restoring that land to the Papacy. George of Poděbrady, the Bohemian king who had once protected Matthias, had made himself too tempting a target when he made enemies out of two Popes and became alienated from most of his Catholic neighbors. Matthias seized Moravia and Silesia from George and proclaimed himself the Czech king; yet Matthias was never able to seize Prague from the Hussites. The war would continue with George's successor Vladislaus II, until the latter signed the Treaty of Brno with Matthias in 1478, recognizing the Hungarian king's conquests. The Peace of Olomouc would confirm the Treaty of Brno.

With Matthias' death in 1490, Vladislaus would succeed Matthias as king of both Hungary and Bohemia.

References

 Tanner, Marcus. The Raven King: Matthias Corvinus, and the Fate of his Library. Yale University Press, 2008.

See also
 Hussite Wars
 Austrian–Hungarian War (1477–1488)

1460s conflicts
1470s conflicts
Wars involving Hungary
1460s in the Holy Roman Empire
15th century in Bohemia
1470s in the Holy Roman Empire
15th century in Hungary
Wars involving Bohemia
George of Poděbrady
Wars between the Czech Republic and Hungary